Nor Khachakap is a village in Lori Province, Armenia.

References

External links 
 (as Saral)

 

Populated places in Armenia
Populated places in Lori Province